Elizabeth Johnson (born 3 December 1985) is a British swimmer who has won gold medals in the Paralympic Games and International Paralympic Committee (IPC) world championships. She has cerebral palsy, placing her in the S6 classification.

Personal life
Johnson was born in Newport, Wales, on 3 December 1985. She has cerebral palsy, and, at the age of three, was encouraged by her mother to join a group for disabled swimmers to strengthen and relax her muscles.  She came to love the sport, competing as an S6 swimmer, and was selected to swim for Team GB at the age of 14. Johnson attended Swansea University and in 2008, completed a degree in business management and finance. She currently lives in Bath, Somerset, and trains with the University of Bath training group, Team Bath.

While Johnson was on the aeroplane to the 2008 Summer Paralympics in Beijing, her mother died after a long battle with cervical cancer.  She decided to continue with the Games when she was told that the funeral could be held when she returned home.

Johnson spends one day a week studying accountancy, and is considering a career in that field when she retires from competitive swimming.

She has been in a relationship with Brazilian para-swimmer Phelipe Rodrigues since 2011.

In July 2016, Johnson appeared in the eleventh series of Celebrity Masterchef on BBC One.

She is an athlete mentor for the Dame Kelly Holmes Trust.

Career

Swimming 
Johnson is significant within the British Para Swimming Team; specialising in breaststroke, she is one of a select few to have won gold medals in the Paralympics, World Championships, and European Championships.

At the 2006 IPC Swimming World Championships in Durban, South Africa, Johnson won an individual gold medal in the 100 metre breaststroke, and two relay golds. She repeated her breaststroke success at the 2009 event, breaking the world record in the process, and also picked up two individual medley bronze medals. She won gold in the 100 metre breaststroke at the 2008 Summer Paralympics, eleven days after the death of her mother, dedicating the victory to her memory.

Johnson's successes were recognised when, in April 2011, she was given the honour of laying the final tile in the competition pool at the London Aquatics Centre. She was also selected as the Paralympic Oath taker for the 2012 Paralympic Games.

Johnson added to her Paralympic medal collection at London 2012 Paralympics, as she set a new Paralympic record en route. Johnson recorded a season's best time of 1:40.90, to take the bronze medal in the SB6 100 m backstroke. In the buildup towards her fourth Paralympics at Rio, Johnson underwent an operation for a hernia. While recovering, she found herself falling behind in her training, which impacted on her preparation for the 2016 Paralympic trials. Her failure to make the trials resulted in her decision to retire from competitive swimming.

Entrepreneurship 
In August 2018, Johnson announced starting "The Ability People" an organization that is aimed at recruiting disabled people beside the able-bodied people without discrimination. In 2018, she was listed as one of the BBC's 100 Women.

References

External links
Liz Johnson Twitter feed

1985 births
Living people
Sportspeople from Newport, Wales
Welsh female swimmers
Paralympic swimmers of Great Britain
Paralympic gold medalists for Great Britain
Paralympic silver medalists for Great Britain
Paralympic bronze medalists for Great Britain
Swimmers at the 2004 Summer Paralympics
Swimmers at the 2008 Summer Paralympics
Swimmers at the 2012 Summer Paralympics
Medalists at the 2004 Summer Paralympics
Medalists at the 2008 Summer Paralympics
Medalists at the 2012 Summer Paralympics
Alumni of Swansea University
S6-classified Paralympic swimmers
BBC 100 Women
Team Bath swimmers
Team Bath Paralympic athletes
Medalists at the World Para Swimming Championships
Medalists at the World Para Swimming European Championships
Paralympic medalists in swimming
British female breaststroke swimmers
British female medley swimmers
21st-century British women